The Marachi are one of sixteen tribes of the Luhya people of Kenya.

Nestled between the Samia, Khayo and Wanga, the Marachi occupy a land area comparatively smaller than the other Luhya tribes in Busia District. In their native Luhya language, the people of Marachi are known as Abamarachi, their land Bumarachi or Ebumarachi and their dialect is Lumarachi. Marachi land is divided into East, West, Central, and North Marachi locations. Significant towns in Marachi are Butula and Bumala. Marachi land has several villages namely; Elukongo, Emauko, Siribo, Bumala "A", Bumala "B", Esikoma, Simuli, Bulwani, Matsanza, Bumakhudu, Bwaliro, Lunyiko, Siamakondi, Emakwara, Mafubu, Kalalani, Tingolo, Bumutiru, Ibanda, Buyayi, Sirandala, Masenjekho, Butunyi, Igula, Burinda, Bujumba, Kingandole, Khunyangu, Buhuyi, Bukhalalire, Busiada, Bumagunda, Namusala, Enakaywa, Madola,Khareka, Mung'ambwa, Bulemia, Emagombe, Emalomba, Lugulu, Bukuyudi Elara, Sibembe, Bukhwaku, Bumina, Echengo, Siroba, Khulunyu, Dadira, Namwitsula, Busire, Buriya, Busibula, Masebula, Isongo, Nango, Bulindo.

Ababere, Abafofoyo, Abamuchama, Abatula, Abamurono, Abang'ayo, Ababule, Abamulembo, Abatelia, Abapwati, Abasumia, Abarano, Abasimalwa, Abakwera, Abamutu, Abamalele, Abakolwe, Ababonwe, Abamucheka, Abaliba, Ababirang'u, Abakolwe, Abade, Abasubo.

History 
Abamarachi is a conglomeration of the above mentioned clans who were under the leadership of Ng'ono Mwami during the pre-colonial days. The name Marachi is derived from Ng'ono Mwami's father who was called Marachi son of Musebe, the son of Sirikwa. So all the Marachi clans owed their allegiance to Ng'ono Mwami from whose lineage of Ababere clan they were founded. The name Marachi was given further impetus by the war-like lifestyle of the descendants of Ng'ono who ruthlessly fought off the Luo expansion of the Jok Omollo a nilotic group that sought to control the Nzoia and Sio Rivers in the area and the fishing grounds around the gulf of Erukala and Ebusijo-modern Port Victoria and Sio Port respectively. This effort to thwart the Luo influence kept the Luo on the other side of River Nzoia in Ugunja and Rundiye areas. The Luo word "Marach" denotes a bad person so Abamarachi were called Marach  since they had defeated them in warfare which was Luyanised into Marachi by affixing a vowel syllable at the end. Ng'ono Mwami had three sons namely; Mulaa, Kusimba and Odunya Mboko. Their children and grandchildren formed a formidable army that formed a ring around the Marachi kingdom.

Clans 
There were ten sub-clans who settled in various villages strategically to protect the integrity of Marachi. Thus:

1.     Banamangi - settled in Bujumba, Bulwani, Elara, Kholera (North Wanga), Wakhungu (Samia)

2.     Abamache -  in Busiada, Inyengwe, Malanga, Bukhuma, Eluche

3.     Abakholo - settled in Bulwani, Namusala, Sibembe, Ibanda, Bukhakhala

4.     Abamulembwa – settled in Inungo, Khulubanga (North Wanga), Bar-Ober

5.     Abamakasi - settled in Enduru, Nyalwanda, Sifundulira

6.     Abakudwa- settled in Kingandole, Esieywe, Murende, Ebumeri

7.     Abekaya - settled in Ematsanza, Ikonzo, Nangina (Samia), Ebujwang'a (Samia)

8.     Abanamwinywi- settled in Ebulemia, Nelaa, Mung'ambwa, Yatsilalo (North Ugenya)

9.     Ababwango - settled in Akanyo, Sirabulwo

10.  Abadunyi - settled in Edadira, Ebujwang'a

The original amakunda/homesteads of Ababere are as follows:

1.    Elwanda (East Ugenya) founded by Ng'ono Mwami

2.    Inyengwe (East Ugenya) founded by Mulaa

3.    Inungo (East Ugenya) founded by Mulaa

4.    Gama (East Ugenya) founded by Kaibe

5.    Ralaki (East Ugenya) founded by Omina Nakudi

6.    Ebudimbe (East Ugenya) founded by Olaka

7.    Bumeri (East Ugenya) founded by Mulayi

8.    Yatsilalo (East Ugenya) founded by Oyiko

9.    Busiada founded by Osama

10.  Bukhalalire founded by Odembo

11.  Namusala founded by Obiero

12.  Nyaranga founded by Odoli

13.  Emagombe founded by Olunga

14.  Emalanga founded by Adieri

15.  Eluche founded by Maima

16.  Elukakha founded by Mwene nayiya

17.  Ebudaliko founded by Sieunda

18.  Emalomba founded by Adieri

19.  Ebuloma founded by Obakha

20.  Ebulwani founded by Majwanda

21.  Esiekodi founded by Mbeja

22.  Imanga founded by Mulayi

23.  Kingandole founded by Opata

24.  Enduru founded by Wakulwa

25.  Ebudunga founded by Wanganya

26.  Nyalwanda founded by Okoth

27.  Esieywe founded by Muduku

28.  Simori founded by Onganga

29.  Ebutunyi founded by Odunya Mboko

30.  Emukane founded by Mukono

31.  Bwaliro founded by Mulamba

32.  Sirabulwo founded by Mayero

33.  Bujumba founded by Butuba

34.  Bukhakhala founded by Majwanda

35.  Ibanda founded by Ofisi

36.  Esigulu founded by Sikemo

37.  Murende founded by Ouma

38.  Esibembe founded by Ngala

39.  Ematsanza founded by Auma Nakudi

40.  Mundasi founded by Namusenda

41.  Ebugeng'i founded by Mulaa

42.  Emasinde founded by Siadi

43.  Ebuduba Mboko founded by Omoto

Some of the markets or upcoming towns and the founders are as follows;

1.     Bumala-founded by Shiundu belongs to Abafofoyo

2.     Bukhalalire founded by Opaso belongs to Ababere

3.     Oloo founded by Oloo Adonda belongs to Ababere

4.     Bulemia belongs to Ababere

5.     Butula belongs to Abafofoyo

6.     Ogalo founded by Ogalo belongs to Ababere

7.     Murumba belongs to Abang'ayo

Pre-colonial times 
In pre-colonial times all the Marachi clans were united under their ruler Ng'ono Mwami. This continued until the advent of Europeans who found it difficult to work with the ruling Ababere clan who were war-like and resistant to colonialism. So they opted to nominate a chief from the Abafofoyo in this case, Oduya then later, Laurent Ongoma. The following were rulers of Marachi before colonialism:

1.     Ng'ono Mwami in pre-colonial days

2.     Mulaa Ng'ono in pre-colonial days

3.     Olaka Owuor in pre-colonial days

4.     Amuga Olaka up to the advent of Europeans in the 1880s

It is said that Mareba, the founding father of the Abafofoyo had settled in Ebulagira having fled the feud over Kingship in Buganda. He together with his cousin Muwanga fled eastwards from Buganda to settle in different regions of Western Kenya. It is said that Mareba was the founding father of Abafofoyo who were the last clan to be assimilated and accommodated among the Marachi. However, as a result of their small numbers in the new settlement, they had to assimilate other groups of persons like Abaderia, Ababere, Abamalere and other Abafofoyo clans. This was made easy due to their common Bantu ancestry and the intermarriage especially between Ababere and Abafofoyo. Omoto the son of Mareba was dispatched to the periphery of what would form Ebumarachi to settle at Murende hills also known as Ebumala-meaning a place where raids are taken. To this day, Kabwodo is known for it cattle raiding escapades. Omoto settled in Ebumala and invited his cousin Shiundu to come and settle there as well. Another brother of Shiundu, Kadima was sent to Ebulemia and started the clan of Abamulembo from the Wanga clan Bamulembwa. This marked the consolidation of the Wanga and Marachi kingdom. Since the Abafofoyo were now secure from palace wars in Uganda and attacks from hostile neighbours such as Luos and Teso, they were able to multiply into a big clan that they are today.

Abafofoyo are spread in what they call Amakunda-homesteads where their forefathers lived. There are basically five settlements of the Abafofoyo. The settlement of Chengo and Indangalasia where Yakobo Kuchio settled, Ebutula where Ex- Senior Chief Laurende Ongoma settled, Elugulu where Ndubi settled, Esikoma where Walobwa and Ebujumba where Rajula settled. Of these settlements, Walobwa would become the father of Oduya the king who ruled in Esikoma. Oduya, Agoro, Ndubi, and Chesa controlled Marachi Central, while Opata, Rajula and Oyula controlled Marachi West. Yakobo Kuchio, Laurende Ongoma (sons of Makokha wa Muyoti) and Ndubi controlled Marachi East. This conglomeration was a strategy employed to space the kingdom and keep away from disease attacks .

Research by the late Mzee Reverend Canon Hanningtone Nyangoro Omotto

Notable Marachi people 
Late Gerald Masibayi (former Marachi east mp)

Late Philip Okwaro Ondusye

See also
 Luhya people
 Luhya languages

References

Luhya